Köse is a town and district of Gümüşhane Province in the Black Sea region of Turkey. According to the 2000 census, population of the district is 7,265 of which 3,162 live in the town of Köse.

Köse district has 14 villages, namely Kayadibi, Kabaktepe, Gökçeköy, Akbaba, Özbeyli, Yuvacık, Örensar, Subaşı, Altıntaş, Bizgili, Övünce, and Salyazı which is a small town.

Notes

References

External links

District governor's official website 
 Road map of Köse district

Populated places in Gümüşhane Province
Districts of Gümüşhane Province